"The Way I Are (Dance with Somebody)" is a song recorded by American singer-songwriter Bebe Rexha featuring American rapper Lil Wayne, from her third extended play (EP) All Your Fault: Pt. 2. It was released on  May 19, 2017 by Warner Bros. Records as the lead single from the EP. The single was leaked a week before its release, though it was deleted soon after. The single was serviced to pop radio on June 6, 2017.

Composition 
"The Way I Are (Dance with Somebody)" samples Whitney Houston's single "I Wanna Dance With Somebody (Who Loves Me)".

Critical reception 
Mike Wass of Idolator gave the song a positive review, calling the single "instantly hummable and sweet relief from the endless stream of left-of-center pop songs on radio."

Music video 
The music video directed by Director X was released on June 1, 2017. The fashion for the music video was inspired by vintage movies such as Grease. The video features video game Just Dance 2018 which the song is featured on.

Live performances 
Bebe Rexha and Lil Wayne performed the single together on Jimmy Kimmel Live!. Rexha later performed a solo version of the song on Good Morning America as part of their Summer Concert Series.

Track listing 
 Digital download

 Digital download

 Digital download

Charts

References 

2017 songs
2017 singles
Warner Records singles
Bebe Rexha songs
Lil Wayne songs
Songs written by Jacob Kasher
Songs written by Bebe Rexha
Music videos directed by Director X
Songs written by Lil Wayne
Songs written by Shannon Rubicam
Songs written by Jonas Jeberg
Songs written by Joel Little
Songs written by Clarence Coffee Jr.
Songs written by George Merrill (songwriter)
Song recordings produced by Joel Little